Stacey Oristano (born May 6, 1979) is an American stage, screen & television actress. She is best known for her role as Mindy Riggins on the television series Friday Night Lights and for starring on ABC Family's Bunheads as Truly Stone.

Career
As a stage and screen actor, Stacey Oristano graduated from Rose Bruford College in London. After graduation she was seen in the West End production of Steel Magnolias (as Annelle). She then moved to New York City, where she toured with Cabaret (as Sally Bowles). Regionally she has performed in Urinetown (as Hope Cladwell); The Spitfire Grill (as Percy Talbot); The Wild Party (as Queenie); and numerous others. She is also a seasoned concert vocalist, having sung in concerts in London, New York, and Dallas. While in New York, Stacey was seen on Chappelle's Show and Tough Crowd with Colin Quinn.

For her best known role, she starred as stripper Mindy Collette-Riggins on the critically acclaimed Friday Night Lights. Initially a minor recurring role, as the series progressed, the character was included into the show's storylines, especially in the last two seasons. She currently hosts the rewatch podcast "Clear Eyes, Full Hearts" with Derek Phillips, who played Billy Riggins (Tim Riggins' older brother, whom Mindy eventually married).

She starred in Amy Sherman-Palladino's Bunheads as Truly Stone, the unhinged Sparkles clothing boutique owner and close friend to Fanny and Michelle.

In January 2015, she replaced Mary Birdsong as Jackie in the off-Broadway production of Disaster!.

Filmography

Film

Television

Theater

Podcast appearances

References

1979 births
Living people
American television actresses
People from Arlington, Texas
Actresses from Texas
Alumni of Rose Bruford College
21st-century American actresses
American stage actresses